José María Usandizaga (31 March 1887–5 October 1915) was a Spanish Basque composer.

A native of San Sebastián, Usandizaga began his musical studies in his hometown before moving to the Schola Cantorum in Paris. There, he was a composition pupil of Vincent d'Indy, and he took piano lessons from Gabriel Grovlez. From 1906 he was back in Spain, where he won success with his works for the stage and a number of other pieces. Usandizaga succumbed to tuberculosis in 1915.

Most of Usandizaga's music is based on Basque themes; among his works are several chamber pieces, some rhapsodies, and the operas Mendi Mendiyan ("High in the Mountains", a Basque language folk opera) and Las golondrinas (The Swallows), initially a zarzuela which was arranged as an opera after the composer's death by his brother). A third opera, the lyric drama La llama ("The Flame"), was left incomplete after his death; this, too was completed by his brother.

References

Naxos.com biography

1887 births
1915 deaths
Basque classical musicians
Basque classical composers
People from San Sebastián
Schola Cantorum de Paris alumni
Spanish classical composers
Spanish male classical composers
20th-century classical composers
20th-century Spanish musicians
Pupils of Vincent d'Indy
20th-century French male musicians